Mario Flores (born 12 September 1943) is a Salvadoran former footballer. He competed in the men's tournament at the 1968 Summer Olympics.

References

External links
 
 

1943 births
Living people
Salvadoran footballers
El Salvador international footballers
Olympic footballers of El Salvador
Footballers at the 1968 Summer Olympics
Sportspeople from Santa Ana, El Salvador
Association football midfielders
C.D. FAS footballers